The United States Congress Bicentennial commemorative coins are a series of commemorative coins which were issued by the United States Mint in 1989.

Legislation
The Bicentennial of the United States Congress Commemorative Coin Act authorized the production of three coins, a clad half dollar, a silver dollar, and a gold half eagle. Congress authorized the coins to commemorate the bicentennial of the United States Congress. The act allowed the coins to be struck in both proof and uncirculated finishes.

Designs

Half Dollar

The obverse of the U.S. Congress Bicentennial commemorative half dollar, designed by Patricia Lewis Verani, features a bust of the Statue of Freedom. The reverse of the coin, designed by William Woodard, features a full view of the Capitol Building surrounded by a wreath.

Dollar

The obverse of the U.S. Congress Bicentennial commemorative dollar, designed by William Woodward, features the Statue of Freedom which towers at the peak of the Capitol Dome. The reverse of the coin, also designed by Woodward, features the Mace of the House of Representatives, which resides in the House Chamber whenever the House is in session along with an eagle astride a world globe.

Half eagle

The obverse of the U.S. Congress Bicentennial half eagle, designed by John Mercanti, features a rendition of the Capitol Dome. The reverse of the coin, also designed by Mercanti, features a portrait of the majestic eagle overlooking the canopy of the Old Senate Chamber.

Specifications
Half Dollar
 Display Box Color: Gray
 Edge: Reeded
 Weight: 11.340 grams
 Diameter: 30.61 millimeters; 1.205 inches
 Composition: 92% copper; 8% nickel (Cupronickel)

Dollar
 Display Box Color: Gray
 Edge: Reeded
 Weight: 26.730 grams; 0.8594 troy ounce
 Diameter: 38.10 millimeters; 1.50 inches
 Composition: 90% Silver, 10% Copper

Half Eagle
 Display Box Color: Gray
 Edge: Reeded
 Weight: 8.359 grams; 0.2687 troy ounce
 Diameter: 21.59 millimeters; 0.850 inch
 Composition: 90% Gold, 3.6% Silver, 6.4% Copper

See also

 United States commemorative coins
 List of United States commemorative coins and medals (1980s)
 US Capitol Bicentennial silver dollar

References

Commemorative coins of the United States
1989 in the United States
Eagles on coins
Maps on coins